Pyrrhopappus pauciflorus, commonly known as smallflower desert-chicory or Texas dandelion, is  a species of flowering plant in the family Asteraceae. It is native to the southern United States and northern Mexico. It is a weedy annual found in prairies, clay soils and disturbed habitats.

References 

Cichorieae